Pilatovci (Cyrillic: Пилатовци) can refer to the following places:

Montenegro
 Pilatovci, Nikšić, a village in the municipality of Nikšić

Croatia
 Pilatovci, Ozalj, a village in the municipality of Ozalj